Richard Henry Arbib (September 1, 1917 in Gloversville, New York – February 22, 1995 in Manhattan, New York City) was an American industrial designer.

He was a design consultant known for working on many products and services. His focus was on automobiles. Arbib created a unique look for the Hudson line that was to share the senior 1955 Nash body as well as his vision of what an automobile would look like in the year 2000, the Astra-Gnome "Time and Space Car."

Family

Richard Henry Arbib was the son of Robert Simeon Arbib, Sr. (March 3, 1889, in Cairo, Egypt – January 1969 in New York) and Edna Josephine Henry (November 3, 1889, in Richmond, Virginia – July 17, 1975, in New York City). Robert Sr. arrived in the United States from Liverpool, England in May 1908. Siblings were Robert Arbib, Jr. (March 17, 1915, in New York – July 1987 in New York) and John A. Arbib (born September 1924 in New York). 

Richard Arbib was married to Audrey Schulz and they were divorced in 1952 in Volusia County, Florida. Audrey later married Associated Press photographer Baron Hans Ferdinand von Nolde (born Berlin, Germany, died November 9, 2002, at 77 years of age). Richard later married Helen W. He dated model Bettie Page in the 1950s.

Career
Arbib graduated from the Pratt Institute in New York City in 1939 after taking industrial-design courses and also serving as vice president of his graduating class. His first job was working as a consultant to the General Motors Art and Color staff that was supervised by Harley Earl.

Arbib was an armament specialist during World War II working for Republic Aviation. He returned to Detroit and worked for the Harley Earl Corporation on a variety of product and service designs that included tires, watches, cameras, and railroad car interiors. Arbib moved to New York and started his independent design consultancy.

Henney and Packard
His first contract was with the Henney Motor Company of Freeport, Illinois, the largest manufacturer of professional car bodies such as ambulances, hearses, and limousines in the United States. Henney was also Packard's sole professional body supplier. Arbib was responsible for the design of the commercial line of Packard built by Henney from 1951 until 1954. His work for Henney included a custom-built Packard Super Station Wagon with seating for 12 passengers, air conditioning, a beverage cabinet, and distinctive curved rear windows. Arbib also provided design consultancy for Packard. He crafted a pillarless Packard Monte Carlo design study, based on a Custom 8 chassis. Next came a more influential concept, the Packard Pan American, based on a Henney-modified Packard 250 convertible that was chopped, channeled, and smoothed into a two-seat luxury roadster.

Arbib designed the Packard show car Pan American for the International Motor Sports Show held in New York City at the Grand Central Palace on March 29, 1952. It was based upon a 1951 Packard 250 convertible and built by Henney. The Pan American won the first-place trophy for the most outstanding design at the show. The sales decline at Packard affected Henney which had an exclusive contract with Packard since 1937. Packard discontinued chassis for the professional-car business and Henney closed the Freeport plant. One of the last assignments for Arbib was for an ambulance based on the 1955 Ford Thunderbird.

American Motors Corporation

In 1955, Arbib was hired by American Motors Corporation (AMC) to create a unique look for the Hudson line that was to share the senior 1955 Nash body. The problem was the Nash's unibody meaning changes can only be done on the trim. Arbib main design theme was to use a "V" form throughout the car, which he dubbed V-Line styling. The design was to correspond with AMC starting to build its own V8 engines to replace the Packard V8 it was using in its Hudson and Nash models. While Arbib was effective to "balance conflicting objectives and present an acceptable finish products," the production 1956 Hudson has been viewed as "badly-compromised styling."

He also designed, and Andrew Mazzara built, the Astra-Gnome "Time and Space Car" concept car that included a "celestial time-zone clock permitting actual flight-type navigation." The design was influenced by space travel forms. The vehicle was based on the Nash Metropolitan and was Arbib's vision of what an automobile would look like in the year 2000. The Astra-Gnome attracted attention at the 1956 International Automobile Show in New York, and was also featured on the cover of Newsweek magazine's September 3, 1956 issue.

Design works
He designed asymmetrical cases for the new Hamilton electric watches in the 1950s, including such notable models as the Ventura, Everest, and Pacer. He also designed watches for Tourneau, Benrus, Sheffield, and Gucci. He designed boats for the Century Boat Company in the 1950s, notably one of their most successful and expensive models, the Coronado, as well as the Arabian model.

Notes

References
 
 
Coachbuilt
Hess Fine Art - An Interview with Richard Arbib

External links
Packard Pan American
Richard Arbib art book
Hamilton Electric watches
Hamilton Ventura electric watches
Monoscoot 
Henney Motor Company
Meet the Ford Atmos
Ford FX-Atmos photo
Pratt Institute website
Century Boat Company
Restoration and history of 1955 Century Coronado 20'
SIvault "Trial by Water - The sleek Century Coronado is handsome—and does, too"

1917 births
1995 deaths
People in the automobile industry
American Motors people
American automobile designers
People from Gloversville, New York
Packard people
Hudson Motor Car Company